Pakhtakor Tashkent FK is an Uzbek professional football club based in Tashkent, Uzbekistan. The club was formed on 8 April 1956 in Tashkent. The club played its first matches against team of Molotov city, now Perm. From 1956 to 1991 Pakhtakor played in different leagues of USSR. From 1992 club has played in the highest Uzbek Football Division, Uzbek League.  The club plays its matches at Pakhtakor Stadium.

Gennadi Denisov holds the record for most overall appearances, having played 371 matches from 1978-1991, ahead of Berador Abduraimov with 358 caps from 1960 to 1974 with interrupts in career for playing in other clubs, and of legendary forward Gennadi Krasnitsky with 300 appearances in 13 seasons played for Pakhtakor.

Gennadi Krasnitsky is club's all-time top scorer with over 200 goals. The 2nd top scorer is Berador Abduraimov with 131 goals. Third all-time top scorer of the club is Igor Shkvyrin with 123 goals.

List of players

List Foreign players

References

External links
 FC Pakhtakor Official Website 

Sport in Tashkent
Pakhtakor Tashkent FK